Frédéric Gérard Saldmann (born 5 May 1953) is a French cardiologist and physician of preventive medicine at the Hôpital Européen Georges-Pompidou. He has treated many actors, businessmen and politicians, including French President François Hollande. Through his consulting firm Sprim, he has advised The Coca-Cola Company, Danone and Nestlé on diet and gluten-free products. He is the author of twelve books on preventive medicine.

Early life
Frédéric Saldmann was born on 5 May 1953 in Le Havre, France. His polish grandfather worked in the textile industry. His parents owned a clothing store in Le Havre.

Saldmann studied cardiology at the University of Paris.

Career
Saldmann started his career as a cardiologist. He subsequently became a physician of preventive medicine in private practice on the Place des Vosges. He later joined the Necker-Enfants Malades Hospital. In 1988, he founded Dietetica, a small business on healthy nutrition.

Saldmann is a physician at the Hôpital Européen Georges-Pompidou in Paris where he specializes in preventive medicine. He has treated businessmen like Jacques-Antoine Granjon and Bernard Tapie; politicians like Jack Lang and Olivier Dassault; author Alexandre Jardin; designer Alber Elbaz; filmmaker Roman Polanski; comedian Stéphane De Groodt; and actors like Claude Lelouch, Charlotte Rampling,  Isabelle Adjani, and Sophie Marceau. He has also treated French President François Hollande at the Élysée Palace.

Saldmann is the founder of Sprim, a consulting firm through which he has advised The Coca-Cola Company, Danone and Nestlé on diet and gluten-free products. Additionally, he is the author of twelve books on preventive medicine. For example, in Le grand ménage, he recommends peeing and pooing as soon as the need comes, as well as burping after each meal, farting and perspiring. In La vie et le temps, he argues that 21 ejaculations a month lowers the risk of prostate cancer by a third.

Saldman acted as a physician in 24 Days, a 2014 film about the affair of the Gang of Barbarians, directed by Alexandre Arcady. He was also played by Eddy Mitchell in Claude Lelouch's Salaud, on t'aime.

Personal life
Saldmann was married four times and has four children. He resides in central Paris with his wife Marie. They also own a former monastery in Deux-Sèvres.

Selected works

References

Living people
1953 births
French people of Polish descent
People from Le Havre
Physicians from Paris
University of Paris alumni
French cardiologists
French medical writers
French company founders